Cheongjin-dong is a dong, neighbourhood of Jongno-gu in Seoul, South Korea. It is a legal dong (법정동 ) administered under its administrative dong (행정동 ), Jongno.

Attraction
 Haejangguk street

See also 
Administrative divisions of South Korea

References

External links
 Jongno-gu Official site in English
 Jongno-gu Official site
 Status quo of Jongno-gu by administrative dong 
 Resident office info and map of Jongno-gu

Neighbourhoods of Jongno-gu